Gärdet is a part of Stockholm, east and northeast of Östermalm. Its official name is Ladugårdsgärdet. It is renowned for its large number of modernist apartments. Gärdet is one of the largest residential districts built in Stockholm during the 1930s, built from 1929 until around 1950, and houses about 10,000 people. The district includes a vast open space used for recreational purposes; the name Gärdet ("the field") often refers to this area specifically. During the summer semester, there are several different events on "the field" such as circus, music and sports and more.

All the buildings around Tessinparken were built between 1932 and 1937.

Public transport 
Gärdet metro station (red line)

External links 
Housing prototypes page with description of housing
gärdet – Wiktionary

Districts of Stockholm
Housing in Sweden